The Town of Cokedale is a Statutory Town located in Las Animas County, Colorado, United States.  The town population was 127 at the 2020 United States Census.

History
Cokedale is a former coal mining town. The mine shut down in 1947.  The town was 5 miles away from the epicenter of a 5.3 earthquake on August 23, 2011.

Much of the town is included in the Cokedale Historic District, which is listed on the National Register of Historic Places.

Geography
Cokedale is located at  (37.144508, -104.621224).

Demographics

As of the census of 2000, there were 139 people, 62 households, and 40 families residing in the town. The racial makeup of the town was 89.21% White, 0.72% Native American, 7.19% from other races, and 2.88% from two or more races. Hispanic or Latino of any race were 43.17% of the population.

There were 62 households, out of which 24.2% had children under the age of 18 living with them, 54.8% were married couples living together, 4.8% had a female householder with no husband present, and 33.9% were non-families. 30.6% of all households were made up of individuals, and 21.0% had someone living alone who was 65 years of age or older. The average household size was 2.24 and the average family size was 2.83.

In the town, the population was spread out, with 23.0% under the age of 18, 4.3% from 18 to 24, 20.1% from 25 to 44, 30.2% from 45 to 64, and 22.3% who were 65 years of age or older. The median age was 46 years. For every 100 females, there were 107.5 males. For every 100 females age 18 and over, there were 98.1 males.

The median income for a household in the town was $23,958, and the median income for a family was $40,179. Males had a median income of $20,000 versus $26,250 for females. The per capita income for the town was $15,503. There were 7.3% of families and 6.9% of the population living below the poverty line, including 7.0% of under eighteens and 5.1% of those over 64.

See also

Colorado
Bibliography of Colorado
Index of Colorado-related articles
Outline of Colorado
List of counties in Colorado
List of municipalities in Colorado
List of places in Colorado
Spanish Peaks

References

External links

Town of Cokedale website
CDOT map of the Town of Cokedale
Cokedale @ Sangres.com

Towns in Las Animas County, Colorado
Towns in Colorado
1948 establishments in Colorado